The Reich Ministry of Food and Agriculture (abbreviated RMEL) was responsible for agricultural policy of Germany during the Weimar Republic from 1919 to 1933 and during the Nazi Dictatorship of the Third Reich from 1933 to 1945. It was under the office of the Secretary of State. On 1 January 1935, the ministry was merged with the Prussian Ministry of Agriculture, Domains and Forestry, founded in 1879. In 1938 it was renamed "Reich and Prussian Ministry of Food and Agriculture". After the end of National Socialism in 1945 and the occupation, the Federal Ministry of Food and Agriculture was established in 1949 as a successor in the western Federal Republic of Germany.

History 
In March 1919, the Reichsernährungsamt was the first to establish the "Reich Ministry of Food". This was combined with the Reich Ministry of Economics in September 1919 and re-founded during the Kapp Putsch in March 1920 under the name "Reich Ministry of Food and Agriculture". In the same year, the ministry moved into the Palace of Prince Alexander and Prince George at 72 Wilhelmstrasse in Berlin.  From 1924, four large-format paintings by August Weber were on loan in the building, and since 1945 they have been lost.

After the Nazis seized power on January 30, 1933, the ministry was initially led by Alfred Hugenberg.  Coerced into resignation during June 1933, Hugenburg was succeeded by Kurt Schmitt and Walther Darré. The latter took over on June 30, 1933 as "Reichsbauernführer" the management of the Reich Ministry of Food and Agriculture, where he was in this function also created for the Gleichschaltung of agriculture Reichsnährstand. The Nazi Darré, took personal leadership of the official party apparatus belonging to the Agricultural Policy Office (from 1936 "Reich Office for Agrarian Policy", and then from 1942 "Reich Office for the country people").  The office was responsible for the management and supervision of the Reichsnährstandes. 

The RMEL, as it were, took over the state's supervision of the Reichsnährstand organization. As a result, individual areas of responsibility were gradually transferred to other NS authorities. Thus, in 1934, by founding the Reich Ministry of Food and Agriculture, the Reich Forestry Office under the leadership of Hermann Göring was established as the highest Reich authority for forestry and hunting, timber management, and nature conservation. The Reich Forestry was in turn united on January 1, 1935 with the Prussian State Forestry.  Goring's deputy and de facto head of German Forestry was Walter von Keudell, and then from 1937 Friedrich Alpers. Furthermore, in the years 1934 and 1935, the agricultural vocational and technical education were spun off into the Reich Ministry of Science, Education and Culture a directorate of the Reich Ministry of the Interior. On September 22, 1938, it also followed by decree of the Reich Minister, that all research institutes derived from the fishing industry would be collected in one Reich Institute for Fisheries.

Reich Minister

State Secretary

References 

1945 disestablishments
Ministries established in 1919
Agriculture ministries
Food and Agriculture
Agricultural organisations based in Germany